Kashil Union is a union of Basail Upazila, Tangail District, Bangladesh. It is situated at 4 km west of Basail 12 km east of Tangail.

Demographics

According to Population Census 2011 performed by Bangladesh Bureau of Statistics, The total population of Kashil union is 25,761. There are  6,223 households in total.

Education

The literacy rate of Kashil Union is 50.4% (Male-53.2%, Female-48%).

See also
 Union Councils of Tangail District

References

Populated places in Dhaka Division
Populated places in Tangail District
Unions of Basail Upazila